In computer networking, the Datagram Congestion Control Protocol (DCCP) is a message-oriented transport layer protocol. DCCP implements reliable connection setup, teardown, Explicit Congestion Notification (ECN), congestion control, and feature negotiation.

Operation

DCCP provides a way to gain access to congestion-control mechanisms without having to implement them at the application layer. It allows for flow-based semantics like in Transmission Control Protocol (TCP), but does not provide reliable in-order delivery. Sequenced delivery within multiple streams as in the Stream Control Transmission Protocol (SCTP) is not available in DCCP. A DCCP connection contains acknowledgment traffic as well as data traffic.  Acknowledgments inform a sender whether its packets have arrived, and whether they were marked by Explicit Congestion Notification (ECN).  Acknowledgements are transmitted as reliably as the congestion control mechanism in use requires, possibly completely reliably.

DCCP has the option for very long (48-bit) sequence numbers corresponding to a packet ID, rather than a byte ID as in TCP. The long length of the sequence numbers aims to guard against "some blind attacks, such as the injection of DCCP-Resets into the connection".

Applications

DCCP is useful for applications with timing constraints on the delivery of data. Such applications include streaming media, multiplayer online games and Internet telephony.  In such applications, old messages quickly become useless, so that getting new messages is preferred to resending lost messages.  such applications have often either settled for TCP or used User Datagram Protocol (UDP) and implemented their own congestion-control mechanisms, or have no congestion control at all. While being useful for these applications, DCCP can also serve as a general congestion-control mechanism for UDP-based applications, by adding, as needed, mechanisms for reliable or in-order delivery on top of UDP/DCCP. In this context, DCCP allows the use of different, but generally TCP-friendly congestion-control mechanisms.

Implementations

The following operating systems implement DCCP:
 FreeBSD, version 5.1  as patch
 Linux since version 2.6.14  
Userspace library:
 DCCP-TP  implementation is optimized for portability, but has had no changes since June 2008.
 GoDCCP purpose of this implementation is to provide a standardized, portable NAT-friendly framework for peer-to-peer communications with flexible congestion control, depending on application.

Packet Structure

The DCCP generic header takes different forms depending on the value of X, the Extended Sequence Numbers bit.  If X is one, the Sequence Number field is 48 bits long, and the generic header takes 16 bytes, as follows.

If X is zero, only the low 24 bits of the Sequence Number are transmitted, and the generic header is 12 bytes long.

Source port (16 bits)Identifies the sending port
Destination port (16 bits)Identifies the receiving port
Data Offset (8 bits): The offset from the start of the packet's DCCP header to the start of its application data area, in 32-bit words.
CCVal (4 bits)Used by the HC-Sender CCID
Checksum Coverage (CsCov) (4 bits) Checksum Coverage determines the parts of the packet that are covered by the Checksum field.
Checksum (16 bits) The Internet checksum of the packet's DCCP header (including options), a network-layer pseudoheader, and, depending on Checksum Coverage, all, some, or none of the application data
Reserved (Res) (3 bits) Senders MUST set this field to all zeroes on generated packets, and receivers MUST ignore its value
Type (4 bits) The Type field specifies the type of the packet
Extended Sequence Numbers (X) (1 bit) Set to one to indicate the use of an extended generic header with 48-bit Sequence and Acknowledgement Numbers
Sequence Number (48 or 24 bits) Identifies the packet uniquely in the sequence of all packets the source sent on this connection

Current development
Similarly to the extension of TCP protocol by multipath capability (MPTCP) also for DCCP the multipath feature is under discussion at IETF   correspondingly denoted as  MP-DCCP. First implementations have already been developed, tested, and presented in a collaborative approach between operators and academia  and are available as an open source solution.

See also 
 Stream Control Transmission Protocol (SCTP)

References

External links
 IETF Datagram Congestion Control Protocol (dccp) Charter

Protocol Specifications
  — Datagram Congestion Control Protocol
  — The Datagram Congestion Control Protocol (DCCP) Service Codes
  — DCCP Simultaneous-Open Technique to Facilitate NAT/Middlebox Traversal
  — RTP and the DCCP
  — Datagram Transport Layer Security (DTLS) over DCCP
  — Quick-Start for DCCP
  — A Datagram Congestion Control Protocol UDP Encapsulation for NAT Traversal

Congestion Control IDs
  — Profile for DCCP Congestion Control ID 2: TCP-like Congestion Control
  — Profile for DCCP Congestion Control ID 3: TCP-Friendly Rate Control (TFRC)
  — Profile for DCCP Congestion Control ID 4: TCP-Friendly Rate Control for Small Packets (TFRC-SP)

Other Information
  — Problem Statement for the Datagram Congestion Control Protocol (DCCP)
 DCCP page from one of DCCP authors
 DCCP support in Linux
 Datagram Congestion Control Protocol (DCCP)

Transport layer protocols